The Great Khural (Parliament) of the Republic of Tuva is the regional parliament of Tuva, a federal subject of Russia. A total of 32 deputies are elected for five-year terms.

Elections

2014

2019

See also
List of chairpersons of the Great Khural of Tuva
List of presidents of the Chamber of Representatives of the Great Khural of Tuva
List of presidents of the Legislative Chamber of the Great Khural of Tuva

Notes

References

Tuva
Politics of Tuva
Tuva